Pseudomaevia is a genus of jumping spiders that was first described by William Joseph Rainbow in 1920.  it contains only two species and one subspecies, found only in Australia, on the Polynesian Islands, and Tahiti: P. cognata, P. insulana, and P. i. aorai. The name is a combination of the Ancient Greek "pseudo-", meaning "false", and the salticid genus Maevia.

References

Salticidae genera
Salticidae
Spiders of Oceania
Taxa named by William Joseph Rainbow